Tyuprikha is a rural locality (a village) in Zaborskoye Rural Settlement, Tarnogsky District, Vologda Oblast, Russia. The population was 131 as of 2002.

Geography 
Tyuprikha is located 23 km southwest of Tarnogsky Gorodok (the district's administrative centre) by road. Ploshilovskaya is the nearest rural locality.

References 

Rural localities in Tarnogsky District